The 22353 / 22354 Patna–SMVT Bengaluru Humsafar Express is a superfast train belonging to East Central Railway zone that runs between Patna Junction and SMVT Bengaluru of Bengaluru city.

It is currently being operated with 22353/22354 train numbers on a weekly basis.

Coach Composition 

The trains is completely 3-tier AC sleeper trains designed by Indian Railways with features of LED screen display to show information about stations, train speed etc. and will have announcement system as well, Vending machines for tea, coffee and milk, Bio toilets in compartments as well as CCTV cameras.

Service

The 22353/Patna - Sir M. Visvesaraya Terminal, Bengaluru Humsafar Express has an average speed of 54 km/hr and covers 2640 km in 48h 45m.

The 22354/Sir M. Visvesaraya Terminal, Bengaluru - Patna Humsafar Express has an average speed of 56 km/hr and covers 2640 km in 47h 30m.

Route & Halts

Traction
This route is fully electrified and both trains are hauled by a Gomoh Loco Shed based WAP-7 locomotive on its entire journey.

Schedule

See also 

 Humsafar Express
 Patna Junction railway station
 Banaswadi railway station

Notes

References 

Humsafar Express trains
Rail transport in Andhra Pradesh
Rail transport in Bihar
Rail transport in Karnataka
Rail transport in Maharashtra
Rail transport in Madhya Pradesh
Rail transport in Tamil Nadu
Rail transport in Telangana
Rail transport in Uttar Pradesh
Transport in Patna
Transport in Bangalore
Railway services introduced in 2019